Olivewood Elementary School may refer to:

 Olivewood Elementary School, National City, California, United States
 Olivewood Elementary School, Saddleback Valley Unified School District, California, United States